Ceuthonectes is a genus of copepods in the family Canthocamptidae. It includes the Slovenian endemic species C. rouchi, which is listed as a vulnerable species on the IUCN Red List. Ceuthonectes contains the following species:

Ceuthonectes boui Apostolov, 2002
Ceuthonectes bulbiseta Apostolov, 2002
Ceuthonectes chappuisi Rouch, 1980
Ceuthonectes colchidanus (Borutsky, 1930)
Ceuthonectes gallicus Chappuis, 1928
Ceuthonectes haemusi Apostolov, 2000
Ceuthonectes hungaricus Pónyi, 1958
Ceuthonectes latifurcatus (Borutsky, 1931)
Ceuthonectes mirabilis Miura, 1964
Ceuthonectes pescei Cottarelli & Saporito, 1985
Ceuthonectes petkovskii Karanovic, 1999
Ceuthonectes rouchi Petkovski, 1984
Ceuthonectes serbicus Chappuis, 1924
Ceuthonectes vievilleae Rouch, 1980

References

Harpacticoida
Taxonomy articles created by Polbot